"Queen of Memphis" is a song written by Dave Gibson and Kathy Louvin, and recorded by American country music band Confederate Railroad.  It was released in December 1992 as the third single from their album Confederate Railroad.  It peaked at number 2 in the United States (behind "What Part of No" by Lorrie Morgan), and number 3 in Canada. It is the band's highest-peaking single.

Music video
The music video was directed by John Ware and premiered in early 1993 and features former NFL coach Jerry Glanville.

Chart positions

Year-end charts

References

Confederate Railroad songs
1992 singles
Song recordings produced by Barry Beckett
Songs written by Dave Gibson (American songwriter)
Atlantic Records singles
Songs about Memphis, Tennessee
1992 songs